Kaimganj is a constituency of the Uttar Pradesh Legislative Assembly covering the city of Kaimganj in the Farrukhabad district of Uttar Pradesh, India.

Kaimganj is one of five assembly constituencies in the Farrukhabad Lok Sabha constituency. Since 2008, this assembly constituency is numbered 192 amongst 403 constituencies.

Election results

2022

2017
Bharatiya Janta Party candidate Amar Singh Khatik won in 2017 Uttar Pradesh Legislative Elections defeating Samajwadi Party candidate Dr. Surabhi by a margin of 36,622 votes.

References

External links
 

Assembly constituencies of Uttar Pradesh
Farrukhabad district